King Charles I School is a coeducational secondary school and sixth form located in the town of Kidderminster, Worcestershire, England.

Present day and Ofsted
King Charles I School is a specialist science college, and renewed their specialist status in September 2009. In September 2011, King Charles I School was inspected by OFSTED inspectors during a 2-day section 5 inspection. The inspection deemed the school to be "Good, grade 2" (1 being outstanding, 2 good, 3 satisfactory & 4 inadequate), stating "King Charles 1 is a good school that puts students at the heart of everything it does". However, the inspectors lowered the previous grade of the Sixth Form from "Good" in the 2008 report, to "Satisfactory", stating "standards have fluctuated since the school was last inspected but students make satisfactory progress".

History

Grammar school
The school was founded around 1566 by Thomas Blount, Esq., Lord of the Manor of Kidderminster. It was in the chantry of the Parish Church of St. Mary and All Saints from 1566 until 1848, when it moved to the site known as Woodfield, on the Bewdley Road. It was granted its royal charter in 1636 by King Charles I and was the only school in England to bear his name. The original premises, Woodfield House built in 1785, and the Hall built about 1848, are now listed buildings. .

Comprehensive
When administered by Hereford and Worcester County Council in 1977 the Queen Elizabeth I Grammar School, Hartlebury (all Boys Grammar School) merged with the two Kidderminster grammar schools, King Charles I Grammar School for Boys and the Kidderminster High School for Girls, the latter was founded in 1868, and moved in 1912 to Hillgrove House, which is now also a Grade II listed building.

This marked the end of the Grammar School system in Kidderminster as the change was completed to comprehensive education. The transition to comprehensive took place gradually, until the early 1980s, becoming a ten-form entry a 13–18 comprehensive school from a six-form entry grammar school.

Mergers
It has been subject to several mergers and in line with district school reorganization, following an amalgamation of middle schools and high schools it reopened in 2007 to operate from two campuses, with a total capacity of around 1350 students aged 11 to 18. Under its new structure, the school retains its specialist status as a Science College that was awarded in 2003 and has facilities that cater for students with special needs. Following a November 2011 Ofsted inspection, the school was awarded a Grade 2 (Good) rating.

Buildings
The school was enlarged with the Brooks Building neighbouring the Sixth Form Rose Garden, and which functions as a science laboratory and theatre. The school has two campuses with the lower school for Year 7-8's operating from the premises of the former Comberton Middle School site in Kidderminster. On both campuses the school caters for linguistically challenged and autistic students in a Communication Centre, which has a facility on both sites.

Academy
The school converted to academy status in August 2012.

Sixth form
The School offers a sixth form for any students wishing to continue their post-16 studies. Students have the option of participating in activities such as a recognised first aid course, formal debate, and talks from lecturers on various issues such as driving skills and ethical issues in farming.

Curriculum
The school offers a wide range of extra-curricular provision, especially in sport. In July 1979 the school held the Guinness world record for the longest continuous cricket match.

Notable alumni

 Tom Watson, Labour MP from 2001-2019 for West Bromwich East

King Charles I Grammar School
 Mo Anthoine, mountaineer
 Alan Bowkett, businessman
 Steven Davies, English cricketer, formerly of Worcestershire, now playing for Surrey
 Paul Frampton, physicist
 Lt-Col Brian Turner Tom Lawrence, winner of the Victoria Cross during the Boer War
 Walter Nash, former Prime Minister of New Zealand
 Clifford T. Ward, singer-songwriter
 Charles Wood, playwright and scriptwriter

Kidderminster High School for Girls
 Stephanie Bidmead, actress, notably in Doctor Who
 Mal Lewis Jones, author
 Monica Jones, partner of poet Philip Larkin
 Debra Shipley, Labour MP from 1997–2005 for Stourbridge

See also 
List of English and Welsh endowed schools (19th century)
Kidderminster Register Office

References

External links

 King Charles I High School
 The Old Carolians Association
 Old Elizabethans Association

Educational institutions established in the 1630s
1636 establishments in England
Secondary schools in Worcestershire
Defunct grammar schools in England
Academies in Worcestershire
Buildings and structures in Kidderminster
Schools with a royal charter
People educated at King Charles I School